Enyucado is a cheesecake in Colombian cuisine cassava cake made with cassava and coconut, sugar, and sometimes anise, and guava jam. Enyucado is from the Caribbean region of Colombia. 

In Costa Rican cuisine, an enyucado is a fried cassava croquette generally filled with ground meat, cheese, or vegetables.

See also
 Cassava-based dishes
 List of cakes

References

Colombian cuisine
Desserts
Cassava dishes
Guava dishes
Foods containing coconut
Cheesecakes